The 2005–06 Sacramento Kings season was the franchise's 57th season in the National Basketball Association (NBA) and the 21st in Sacramento, California. The team began the season looking to improve upon a 50–32 record from the previous season, but off-court problems meant they declined by six wins despite a late rush.

In the playoffs, the Kings lost to the San Antonio Spurs in six games in the First Round.

As of 2022, this marked the last season that the Kings made the playoffs, which is the longest active drought in the four major North American sports. Until 2023, this was the last time the Kings had a winning season.

For this season, they added new gold road alternate uniforms with purple, grey and silver side panels to their jerseys and shorts, they remained in used until 2007.

Offseason

NBA Draft

Roster

Regular season

The 2005–06 season started off poorly, as the Kings had a hard time finding chemistry in the team. Newcomers Bonzi Wells and Shareef Abdur-Rahim made major contributions early in the season, but both fell victim to the injury bug and missed a significant number of games. As the Kings’ dismal start continued, the Maloofs decided to make a major move.

Popular sharpshooting small forward Peja Stojakovic was traded for Ron Artest, long known for his volatile temper. Artest guaranteed the Kings would make the playoffs. With Artest in the lineup, the Kings achieved a 20–9 record after the 2006 NBA All-Star Weekend, which was the second best post-All-Star break record that season. The Kings finished the regular season with a 44–38 record, which placed them fourth in the Pacific Division, only ahead of the Golden State Warriors. Their season ended with a defeat to the San Antonio Spurs in the first round 2–4. After the season, Rick Adelman was not retained. To date this is the last winning season the Kings have achieved, and the franchise has yet to return to the playoffs.

Standings

Record vs. opponents

Player stats
Note: GP= Games played; REB= Rebounds; AST= Assists; STL = Steals; BLK = Blocks; PTS = Points; AVG = Average

Playoffs

|- align="center" bgcolor="#ffcccc"
| 1
| April 22
| @ San Antonio
| L 88–122
| Mike Bibby (17)
| Shareef Abdur-Rahim (9)
| Ron Artest (4)
| AT&T Center18,797
| 0–1
|- align="center" bgcolor="#ffcccc"
| 2
| April 25
| @ San Antonio
| L 119–128 (OT)
| Bonzi Wells (28)
| Bonzi Wells (12)
| Mike Bibby (6)
| AT&T Center18,797
| 0–2
|- align="center" bgcolor="#ccffcc"
| 3
| April 28
| San Antonio
| W 94–93
| Mike Bibby (25)
| Bonzi Wells (14)
| Mike Bibby (8)
| ARCO Arena17,317
| 1–2
|- align="center" bgcolor="#ccffcc"
| 4
| April 30
| San Antonio
| W 102–84
| Bonzi Wells (25)
| Bonzi Wells (17)
| Mike Bibby (7)
| ARCO Arena17,317
| 2–2
|- align="center" bgcolor="#ffcccc"
| 5
| May 2
| @ San Antonio
| L 98–109
| Bonzi Wells (38)
| Bonzi Wells (12)
| three players tied (4)
| AT&T Center18,797
| 2–3
|- align="center" bgcolor="#ffcccc"
| 6
| May 5
| San Antonio
| L 83–105
| Mike Bibby (19)
| Bonzi Wells (11)
| Ron Artest (4)
| ARCO Arena17,317
| 2–4
|-

Awards and honors

References

 Sacramento Kings on Database Basketball
 Sacramento Kings on Basketball Reference

Sacramento Kings seasons
Sacramento
Sacramento
Sacramento